Vicente Gonzalez Jr. (born September 4, 1967) is an American lawyer and politician who has served as the United States representative for Texas's 34th congressional district since 2023 and served as the representative for Texas's 15th congressional district from 2017 to 2023. He is a member of the Democratic Party.

Early life
Gonzalez was born in Corpus Christi, Texas, in 1967. He grew up in a working-class family, often working odd jobs that displayed entrepreneurial skills. He went to Roman Catholic School in Corpus Christi for part of his childhood. In 11th grade, he dropped out of high school. He returned to school through a G.E.D. and enrolled at Del Mar Junior College, where he received an associate degree in banking and finance. In 1992, Gonzalez earned his Bachelor of Science in aviation business administration from the Embry–Riddle Aeronautical University on the Corpus Christi Naval Air Station. In 1996, he graduated from Texas Wesleyan University School of Law (now the Texas A&M University School of Law) with a Juris Doctor.

Gonzalez founded his law firm, V. Gonzalez & Associates, in 1997. He recovered tens of millions of dollars for plaintiffs nationwide and was nominated to the "Multi-Million Dollar Advocates Forum." He is a member of Texas's and New York's bar associations. He is also licensed to practice before the United States Supreme Court.

U.S. House of Representatives

Elections

2016 

As a newcomer to politics, Gonzalez declared his candidacy in 2016 for the United States House of Representatives in  after Rubén Hinojosa, the incumbent representative, announced he would not run for reelection. He won the Democratic Party nomination, defeating Sonny Palacios in the runoff election. He defeated Republican Tim Westley in the November general election with 57.3% of the vote to Westley's 37.7%.

2018 

Gonzalez defeated Westley again with 59.7% of the vote to Westley's 38.7%.

2020 

In 2020, Gonzalez's seat became unexpectedly competitive. He defeated Republican Monica De La Cruz by a narrower margin than he had in his previous two victories, with 50.5% of the vote to Cruz-Hernandez's 47.6%.

2022 

After Texas's redistricting based on the 2020 census, Gonzalez in November 2021 announced that he would run for reelection in the 34th district. The 15th district became more Republican but the neighboring 34th became significantly more Democratic. The Texas state legislature put Gonzalez's residence in the 34th. The incumbent in the 34th district, Filemon Vela Jr., had announced earlier in 2021 that he was not seeking reelection, and would endorse Gonzalez regardless of where he ran. Gonzalez won the district's March 2022 Democratic primary. The Republicans nominated Mayra Flores. After Vela resigned on March 31, 2022, Gonzalez declined to run in and instead endorsed Democrat Dan Sanchez in the consequential special election on June 14, 2022, held in the 34th's older, more competitive boundaries. Flores, however, opted to run in the special election, and won with 50.9% of the vote to Sanchez's 43.4%. As a result, Gonzalez and Flores competed against each other in the November 8 general election, in which Gonzalez defeated Flores to become the next representative for the 34th District. In the same election, Gonzalez's 2020 opponent Monica De La Cruz ran in and won in the redrawn 15th District, making her the successor to Gonzalez for that district. 

During the campaign, a blogger who received campaign funds from Gonzalez lobbed racist attacks at Flores, calling her "Miss Frijoles" and "Miss Enchiladas". He accused her of "playing the race card" and called her a "cotton pickin’ liar" for having worked in cotton fields with her immigrant parents as a child. Gonzalez said he had never read the blog and was unaware of the blogger's racist commentary, and committed not to give any more campaign money to the blog.

Tenure
Gonzalez was sworn on January 3, 2017. He is only the seventh person to represent this district since its creation in 1903.

In January 2019, Gonzalez and other members of the bipartisan U.S. House Problem Solvers Caucus met with President Donald Trump in an unsuccessful bid to end the longest federal government shutdown in U.S. history.

Gonzalez received the Order of the Quetzal in January 2020.

In August 2021, Gonzalez joined a group of conservative Democrats, dubbed "The Unbreakable Nine", who threatened to derail the Biden administration's $3.5 trillion budget reconciliation package meant to tackle the nation's infrastructure.

On July 29, 2022, Gonzalez and four other Democrats joined the Republicans in voting against a bill banning assault weapons.

As of June 2022, Gonzalez had voted in line with Joe Biden's stated position 97.3% of the time.

Committee assignments
 Committee on Financial Services
 United States House Financial Services Subcommittee on Investor Protection, Entrepreneurship and Capital Markets
 United States House Financial Services Subcommittee on Housing, Community Development and Insurance
 United States House Financial Services Subcommittee on Diversity and Inclusion
 Committee on Foreign Affairs
 United States House Foreign Affairs Subcommittee on Western Hemisphere, Civilian Security, and Trade
 United States House Foreign Affairs Subcommittee on Europe, Eurasia, Energy, and the Environment

Caucus memberships
 Congressional Hispanic Caucus
 Congressional Oil & Gas Caucus
 Congressional Small Business Caucus
 Congressional Blue Collar Caucus
Medicare for All Caucus
Blue Collar Caucus
Blue Dog Coalition
New Democrat Coalition
Problem Solvers Caucus (former)

Personal life
Gonzalez's wife, Lorena, is a former teacher and school administrator from McAllen, Texas. His father was a merchant seaman who served in the Korean War. Gonzalez lives in McAllen.

Gonzalez is Roman Catholic.

See also

 List of Hispanic and Latino Americans in the United States Congress

References

External links

 Congressman Gonzalez official U.S. House website
 Campaign website
 

 

|-

|-
   

1967 births
21st-century American politicians
Catholic politicians from Texas
Catholics from Texas
Democratic Party members of the United States House of Representatives from Texas
Embry–Riddle Aeronautical University
Hispanic and Latino American members of the United States Congress
Living people
American politicians of Mexican descent
People from McAllen, Texas
Texas A&M University School of Law alumni
Texas lawyers